The 1965–66 Ice hockey Bundesliga season was the eighth season of the Ice hockey Bundesliga, the top level of ice hockey in Germany. 10 teams participated in the league, and EC Bad Tolz won the championship.

First round

Qualification round

Final 
 SC Riessersee – Preußen Krefeld 6:4

Final round

References

Eishockey-Bundesliga seasons
German
Bund